Ketty (Catherine) Thull (February 2, 1905 - October 25, 1987) was a Luxembourg cook, educator, cookbook writer; wrote the influential Luxemburger Kochbuch (1946). On its publication, the book received a positive review in the Luxemburger Wort which commented that it was a "Treasure trove of really interesting, useful recipes". It including 80 precisely described meat dishes, as well as 30 vegetable preparations. It also presents recipes for the national dishes of Luxembourg such as Treipen, Gehäk, Kuddelfleck, Judd mat Gardebo'nen and Sterzein.

Thull, who had studied cookery at the Ecole Le Cordon Bleu in Paris, taught at a housemaids school in Esch-sur-Alzette. In 1937, she published her first book Ratgeber für die Luxemburger Hausfrau beim Konservieren der Nahrungsmittel (Guide for the Luxembourg Housewife on Preserving Foodstuffs), Luxembourg's first-ever cookbook. To supplement her Kochbuch, in 1947 she published Desserts und Backwaren (Desserts and Pastry Cooking). Thull carefully typed each page of her books and had them printed at her own cost. Carlo Sauber, who has updated the cookbook in 2011 for modern users, explained that little is known about Ketty Thull, except that her students remember her as being very strict. She never married and had no children.

Her works have remained popular in Luxembourg, where they are still used for their authentic local recipes.

References

1905 births
1987 deaths
Luxembourgian writers
Luxembourgian women writers
Cookbook writers
Women cookbook writers
20th-century Luxembourgian writers
20th-century women writers